The East Greenwich School Department (EGSD) or East Greenwich Public Schools is a public school district located in East Greenwich, Rhode Island. It is made up of six different schools.

Schools 
 Meadowbrook Farms Elementary School (K-2)
 Frenchtown Elementary School (K-2)
 George R. Hanaford Elementary School (3-5)
 James H. Eldredge Elementary School (3-5)
 Archie R. Cole Middle School (6-8)
 East Greenwich High School (9-12)

References

External links
 East Greenwich School Department
School districts in Rhode Island
East Greenwich, Rhode Island
Education in Kent County, Rhode Island